Thomas Edward Garland was an Australian rules footballer for West Torrens and Port Adelaide. His father, also Tom Garland, was a notable trade unionist.

References

Australian rules footballers from South Australia
Port Adelaide Football Club (SANFL) players
Port Adelaide Football Club players (all competitions)
West Torrens Football Club players
Date of birth missing
Australian people of Scottish descent